Denias, Senandung Di Atas Awan (Denias, Singing on the Cloud) is a 2006 Indonesian film directed by John de Rantau. This film was starring Albert Fakdawer, Ari Sihasale, Nia Zulkarnaen and Marcella Zalianty.

The film received the 2007 Asia Pacific Screen Award for Best Youth Feature Film.

Cast
Mathias Muchus as Pak Guru
Nia Zulkarnaen
 Ryan Stevano William Manoby as Noel
Pevita Eileen Pearce as Angel
Minus Coneston Karoba as Enos
Albert Fakdawer as Denias
Michael Jakarimilena as Denias'Father
Audrey Pailaya
Ari Sihasale as Maleo
Marcella Zalianty

References

External links
 

2006 films
2000s Indonesian-language films
2006 comedy films
Films directed by John de Rantau
Indonesian comedy films